That's the Way I Like It: The Best of Dead or Alive is the third greatest hits album by English pop band Dead or Alive, released in 2010. It is the last release by Dead or Alive before lead singer Pete Burns died in 2016; the box set Sophisticated Boom Box MMXVI was released just five days after his death.

Track listing
"You Spin Me Round (Like a Record)" – from Youthquake
"That's the Way I Like It" (7" version) – from Sophisticated Boom Boom
"Lover Come Back to Me" – from Youthquake
"In Too Deep" (7" remix) – from Youthquake
"My Heart Goes Bang (Get Me to the Doctor)" (7" version) – from Youthquake
"Brand New Lover" (Single edit) – from Mad, Bad, and Dangerous to Know
"Something in My House" (7" remix) – from Mad, Bad, and Dangerous to Know
"Hooked on Love" – from Mad, Bad, and Dangerous to Know
"I'll Save You All My Kisses" (Remix) – from Mad, Bad, and Dangerous to Know
"Turn Around and Count 2 Ten" – from Nude
"Come Home with Me Baby" – from Nude
"Misty Circles" (7" version) – from Sophisticated Boom Boom
"What I Want" (Original 7" version) – from Sophisticated Boom Boom
"I'd Do Anything" (7" version) – from Sophisticated Boom Boom
"Lover Come Back to Me" (Extended remix)
"My Heart Goes Bang" (American "Wipe-Out" Mix – short)
"Something in My House" (Mortevicar Mix)
"You Spin Me Round (Like a Record)" (Murder Mix)

Personnel
Adapted from AllMusic.
Matt Aitken – producer
Jay Burnett – engineer, re-recording
Pete Burns – composer, producer
Harry Wayne "K.C." Casey – composer
Steve Coy – producer
Dead or Alive – composer, primary artist, producer, remixing
Phil Harding – remixing
Zeus B. Held – producer, remixing
Mike Stock – producer

References

External links
That's the Way I Like It: The Best of Dead or Alive at Discogs

Dead or Alive (band) compilation albums
2010 greatest hits albums
Sony Music albums
Albums produced by Stock Aitken Waterman